Zsolt Kovács may refer to:

 Zsolt Kovács (biathlete) (born 1962), Hungarian Olympic biathlete
 Zsolt Kovács (footballer) (born 1986), Hungarian footballer
 Zsolt Kézdi-Kovács (1936–2014), Hungarian film director